Sasbach is a municipality in the district of Ortenau in Western Baden-Württemberg, Germany.

References

Ortenaukreis